The Kentuckiana Metroversity, Inc., is a consortium of eight institutions of higher education in the Louisville metropolitan area. Students attending any one of these schools can take classes at any other school within the consortium. It exists to expand the horizons of prospective students.

Campuses 

The following campuses are affiliated with the Kentuckiana Metroversity:

 Bellarmine University
 Indiana University Southeast
 Ivy Tech Community College Southern Indiana
 Jefferson Community and Technical College
 Louisville Presbyterian Theological Seminary
 Southern Baptist Theological Seminary
 Spalding University
 University of Louisville

External links 

 the Kentuckiana Metroversity Official Website

Education in Louisville, Kentucky
College and university associations and consortia in the United States
 
Education in Clark County, Indiana
Education in Floyd County, Indiana